Sasiny  (Sasyny) is a village in the administrative district of Gmina Boćki, within Bielsk County, Podlaskie Voivodeship, in north-eastern Poland.

According to the 1921 census, the village was inhabited by 132 people, among whom 18 were Roman Catholic, 107 Orthodox, and 1 Mosaic. At the same time, 72 inhabitants declared Polish nationality, 53 Belarusian and 7 Jewish. There were 25 residential buildings in the village.

References

Villages in Bielsk County